Magdalena Sibylle of Holstein-Gottorp (also spelled Magdalena Sibylla; 1631 at Gottorp Castle – 1719 in Güstrow) was a Duchess of Holstein-Gottorp by birth and by marriage Duchess of Mecklenburg-Güstrow.  From 1654 to 1695, she was the consort of Duke Gustav Adolph of Mecklenburg-Güstrow. She is also a direct female line ancestor to Queen Victoria.

Background 
Magdalene Sybille was the daughter of Duke Frederick III of Schleswig-Holstein-Gottorp (1597-1659) and his wife Marie Elisabeth of Saxony (1610-1684).

Widowhood 
After her husband's death, she remained a widow for 26 years.  She retained a small court in Güstrow.  However, after the Mecklenburg-Güstrow line of Dukes had died out, the court in Güstrow lost its former glory and significance.

Marriage and issue 
On 28 December 1654, she married Gustav Adolph, the ruling Duke of Mecklenburg-Güstrow.  They had eleven children but no surviving male heirs.  This leads to a succession dispute that was settled by the Partition of Hamburg (1701), which redivided the interior of the Duchy of Mecklenburg among the surviving lines.
 Johann, Hereditary Prince of Mecklenburg-Güstrow (2 December 1655 – 6 February 1660).
 Eleonore (1 June 1657 – 24 February 1672).
 Marie (June 19, 1659 – 6 January 1701), married on 23 September 1684 to Duke Adolph Frederick II of Mecklenburg-Strelitz.
 Magdalene (5 July 1660 – 19 February 1702).
 Sophie (21 June 1662 – 1 June 1738), married on 6 December 1700 to Duke Christian Ulrich I of Württemberg-Oels.
 Christine (14 August 1663 – 3 August 1749), married on 4 May 1683 to Louis Christian, Count of Stolberg-Gedern.
 Charles, Hereditary Prince of Mecklenburg-Güstrow (18 November 1664 – 15 March 1688), married on 10 August 1687 to Marie Amalie of Brandenburg, a daughter of Elector Frederick William.
 Hedwig (12 January 1666 – 9 August 1735), married on 1 December 1686 to Duke August of Saxe-Merseburg-Zörbig.
 Louise (28 August 1667 – 15 March 1721), married on 5 December 1696 to King Frederick IV of Denmark.
 Elisabeth (3 September 1668 – 25 August 1738), married on 29 March 1692 to Duke Henry of Saxe-Merseburg-Spremberg.
 Augusta (27 December 1674 – 19 May 1756).

Ancestors

References 
 Johann Stieber: 'Merckwürdige und erbauliche Lebensbeschreibung der … Fürstin Magdalena Sibylla, verwitwete regierende Fürstin zu Mecklenburg, Rostock, 1745

Footnotes 

Duchesses of Mecklenburg
House of Holstein-Gottorp
1631 births
1719 deaths
17th-century German people
18th-century German people
Daughters of monarchs